The VVA-Podmoskovye is a Russian rugby union team playing in the Professional Rugby League. The team plays at Gagarin Air Force Academy stadium in Monino, a garrison town just outside Moscow. VVA-Podmoskovye have strong links to the air force and also supplied the bulk of Russia, with which they shared a head coach, Nikolai Nerush. The team had ambitious plans for the future - it lobbied hard for inclusion in the European Challenge Cup and was close to completing a 12,500-seat purpose-built rugby stadium.

VVA-Podmoskovye have won the title eight times, in 1993, 2003, 2004, 2006, 2007, 2008, 2009 and 2010. March 2011 saw two stars depart for Aviva Premiership clubs, with Moldovan international Vadim Cobîlaş joining former Russia coach Steve Diamond at Sale Sharks and Russian international Vasily Artemiev joining Northampton Saints.

Honours
 USSR/Russian Championship (17): 1969, 1971, 1976, 1977, 1980, 1981, 1984, 1985, 1986, 1993, 2003, 2004, 2006, 2007, 2008, 2009, 2010.
 USSR/Russian Cup (13): 1976, 1980, 1983, 1986, 1991, 1992, 1993, 1997, 2002, 2004, 2005, 2007, 2010.

Current squad
2019

Former players now in a professional overseas league 

 -> Sale Sharks
 -> Sale Sharks & Union Bordeaux Bègles
 -> Northampton Saints

International honours 

  Karolis Navickas
  Alexander Khrokin
  Alexei Travkin
  Vladislav Korshunov
  Artem Fatakhov
  Alexander Voytov
  Evegeny Matveev
  Victor Gresev
  Alexander Shakirov
  Alexander Yanyushkin
  Mikhail Babaev
  Sergey Trishin
  Vasily Artemiev
  Igor Klyuchnikov
  Andrey Kuzin

References

External links
 http://www.heavensgame.com/russian-pro-league/russian-league-expands-for-2010

Russian rugby union teams
Sport in Moscow Oblast
Saracens Global Network
Professional Rugby League teams